The surname Marx is a Germanic surname. The origins thereof is most likely Austrian, as the earliest known records of the surname Marx is found in Austria.

"The distinguished Austrian surname Marx is a proud sign of a rich and ancient ancestry. Austria, which was originally home to a Celtic people, was conquered by the Roman Empire in about 15 BC. Following the fall of Rome, Austria was repeatedly invaded by barbarian tribes, such as the Vandals, Visigoths, and Huns, who swept in from the east. During the 5th and 6th centuries, the Alemanni, Avars and Slavs settled Austria. The Avars were defeated in 785 by the Frankish emperor Charlemagne, who set up the East Mark, which later became known as the Österreich. Austria was ruled by the Babenburger dynasty until 1278, when they were succeeded by the Hapsburg dynasty, which ruled Austria until the 20th century. 

Early Origins of the Marx family:

The surname Marx was first found in Austria, where the name could be considered to have made a great contribution to the feudal society which became the backbone of modern Europe. The name became prominent in local affairs and branched into many houses which played important roles in the local and national conflicts, with each group seeking power and status in an ever changing territorial profile."

The German/ Austrian surname can still be found in Germany and Austria. It can also be found in various other places where German settlers moved such as the USA, South Africa and England.

The origins of Marx could possibly be Roman, meaning "of mars" in reference to the Roman god of war. It could also be a derivative of "Marks" and have its origin due to early European Christians naming themselves after the Apostle Mark.

The surname can also be found under the jewish community as is the case with many German surnames, this is due to the fact that jews were persecuted in these states at various times throughout history, and would changed their surnames to local surnames in order to avoid persecution. In the case of the surname Marx, most notably, the father of Karl Marx changed his name to Heinrich Marx in 1817 or 1818 due to the persecution of jews in Prussia.

Marx''' is a Germanised form of the Jewish family name Mordechai. It is also possibly derived from Marcus.

Notable people with the surname
Politics
 Jenny Marx (1814–1881), a German socialist and the wife of Karl Marx
 Karl Marx (1818–1883), 19th-century philosopher
 Jenny Marx (1844–1883), activist and the eldest daughter of Karl Marx
Eleanor Marx (1855–1898), politically active daughter of Karl Marx
 Laura Marx (1845–1911), daughter of Karl Marx and wife of Paul Lafargue
 Heinrich Marx (1777–1838), German lawyer and father of Karl Marx
 Henriette Marx (née Pressburg) (1788–1863), mother of Karl Marx
 Wilhelm Marx (1863–1946), German politician and Chancellor
 Marx Dormoy (1888–1941), French socialist
 Charles Marx (1903–1946), Luxembourgian doctor, political militant and minister
 Arndt-Heinz Marx, German neo-Nazi

Television and film
 Marx Brothers, a team of American sibling comedians that appeared in vaudeville, stage plays, film and television
 The brothers:
 Chico Marx (1887–1961), also a musician
 Harpo Marx (1888–1964), also a musician
 Groucho Marx (1890–1977)
 Gummo Marx (1892–1977)
 Zeppo Marx (1901–1979)
 Other family members:
 Arthur Marx (1921–2011), son of Groucho Marx, writer
 Barbara Marx (1927–2017), wife of Zeppo Marx who later became the final wife of Frank Sinatra
 Gregg Marx (born 1955), grandson of Milton "Gummo" Marx, great-nephew of Groucho, Harpo, Chico and Zeppo Marx, actor known mainly for his work on daytime soap operas
 Melinda Marx (born 1946), daughter of Groucho Marx, writer
 Minnie Marx (1864/5–1929), mother and manager for the Marx Brothers, sister of Al Shean
 Miriam Marx (1927–2017), daughter of Groucho Marx, writer
 Sam Marx (1859–1933), father of the Marx Brothers
 Brett Marx (born 1964), American actor
 Carey Marx, British comedian
 Christy Marx, TV series writer
 Frederick Marx, film producer, editor, writer and director
 Samuel Marx, MGM story editor, film producer, and author

Music
 Adolf Bernhard Marx (1799–1866), musicologue
 Bill Marx (pianist), American pianist, arranger, and composer
 Gary Marx (born 1959), rock musician
 Jeff Marx (born 1970), American composer of musicals
 Joseph Marx (1882–1964), Austrian composer
 Karl Marx (composer) (1897–1985), German composer
 Richard Marx (born 1963), American pop singer

Sports
Daniel Marx (born 1995), American football fullback
Eric Marx (1895–1974), South African cricketer
Franz Marx (born 1963), Austrian wrestler
Greg Marx (1950–2018), American football defensive end
Jack Marx (bridge) (1907–1991), British bridge player
Jan-Hendrik Marx (born 1995), German footballer
Joachim Marx (born 1944), Polish footballer
Josef Marx (1934–2008), German footballer
Malcolm Marx (born 1994), South African rugby union player
Michael Marx (born 1958), American fencer
Nicolas Marx (born 1974), French footballer
Robert Marx (fencer) (born 1956), American fencer
Marx Santos (born 1988), Brazilian footballer
Thorben Marx (born 1981), German footballer
Tiaan Marx (born 1986), South African rugby union player
Travis Marx (born 1977), American mixed martial artist

In other fields
 Adolph Marx (bishop) (1915–1965), American Roman Catholic bishop
 Anthony Marx (born 1959), President and CEO of New York Public Library
 Bill Marx (born 1937), American theater and arts critic
  (1911–1991) German artist and Bauhaus student
 Clare Marx (1954–2022), British surgeon
 Ellen Marx (born 1939), German artist and author
 Enid Marx (1902–1998), English painter and designer
 Erwin Otto Marx (1893–1980), German engineer and inventor
 Friedrich Marx (1859–1941), German classical philologist
  (1830–1905), Austrian poet and officer
 George Marx (1838–1895), German-born American arachnologist, scientific illustrator, and physician
 György Marx (1927–2002), Hungarian physicist, astrophysicist, science historian, and professor
 Hellmuth Marx (1915–2002), Austrian sculptor
 Herbert Marx (politician) (born 1932), Canadian lawyer, university law professor, politician, and judge
 Jack Marx (20th and 21st centuries), Australian journalist and author
 Karl Marx (medical missionary), German doctor
 Karl Friedrich Heinrich Marx, German physician and lecturer
 Leo Marx (born 1919), professor at MIT
 Louis Marx (1896–1982), American toy maker and businessman
 Mona Magdeleine Marx; known more commonly by married name Mona Beaumont, French-born American painter, printmaker
 Paul Marx (monk) (1920–2010), American Roman Catholic priest, sociologist, anti-abortion activist, and writer
 Paul John Marx (1935–2018), French Roman Catholic bishop
 Philipp Marx (born 1982), retired German tennis player
 Reinhard Marx (born 1953), Cardinal, Archbishop of Munich and Freising
 Robert F. Marx (1936–2019), American underwater archaeologist
 Roberto Burle Marx (1909–1994), Brazilian landscape designer
 Thierry Marx (born 1962), French chef

Other media
 Bernard Marx, one of the main characters in the novel Brave New World by Aldous Huxley
 Carlo Marx, character in the novel On the Road by Jack Kerouac
 Skidd McMarxx, minor character in the game Ratchet and Clank'', whose name is primarily a play on words (he plays a sport similar to Slalom snowboarding)

See also
Marcks (disambiguation)
Marks (disambiguation)
Marx (disambiguation)

References

German-language surnames
Jewish surnames
Surnames from given names